Acontias aurantiacus, the golden blind legless skink, is a species of lizard in the family Scincidae. It is found in Zimbabwe, Mozambique, Botswana, and South Africa.

Three subspecies are recognized:

References

Acontias
Skinks of Africa
Reptiles of Botswana
Reptiles of Mozambique
Reptiles of South Africa
Reptiles of Zimbabwe
Reptiles described in 1854
Taxa named by Wilhelm Peters